Ostrovica is a small village in the Municipality of Hrpelje-Kozina in the Littoral region of Slovenia. Until January 2007, the settlement was part of the Municipality of Divača.

References

External links
Ostrovica on Geopedia

Populated places in the Municipality of Hrpelje-Kozina